Weißensberg is a municipality in the district of Lindau in Bavaria in Germany.

Until 1955, Weißensberg belonged to the Bavarian district of Lindau, which was in the French occupation zone and had special benefits. The entire tax revenue remained “in the state of Lindau” and you could feel the political and economic fate of the highly esteemed District President Zwiesler everywhere. After the currency reform, all school desks were replaced, and in 1949 a third classroom was set up on the first floor.

References

Lindau (district)